Microdytes maculatus, is a species of predaceous diving beetle found in India, Thailand, Southern Andaman Islands, Sri Lanka, China, Thailand, Laos and Myanmar.

Description
This smaller species has an oblong-oval, slightly rhomboid, and moderately convex body. Total length is about 1.6 to 1.9 mm. Head rufo-testaceous. Clypeus not bordered. Head finely, sparsely and relatively regularly punctured. Antennae flavo-testaceous, which are moderately long and slender. Pronotum rufo-testaceous and finely bordered, regularly rounded lateral margin. Pronotal punctures are regular, sparse and moderately strong on disc. Coarse punctures found along the posterior margin. Elytra ferrugineous, with a distinct testaceous transverse band on the base. There is a triangular apical spot and a small round post-median testaceous spot located near the suture. Elytral punctures are fairly fine and regular, and moderately dense. Epipleura, prothorax, metacoxae medially and abdomen are testaceous on ventral side. Rest of the ventrum ferrugineous. Metasternum moderately strongly and irregularly punctured. Abdomen without punctures. Legs are testaceous.

References 

Dytiscidae
Insects of Sri Lanka
Insects described in 1859